Xenophora japonica is a species of large sea snail, a marine gastropod mollusk in the family Xenophoridae, the carrier shells.

Description

Distribution

References

Xenophoridae
Gastropods described in 1971